Donald Bruce Fiedler (February 2, 1943 - May 15, 2008) was an American cannabis rights activist. In 1989, he succeeded Jon Gettman as the executive director of NORML. He held that position until 1991 when he was replaced by Richard Cowan. He died at the age of 65 on Thursday May 15, 2008.

References

American cannabis activists
2008 deaths
1943 births